David Ramsay (1883–1948) was a British socialist activist.

Born in Edinburgh, Ramsay became a patternmaker and joined the Amalgamated Society of Engineers.  He joined the Social Democratic Federation and then its successor, the British Socialist Party (BSP).  However, by the start of World War I, he had joined the Socialist Labour Party (SLP) and had relocated to Leicester.  He was a fervent opponent of the war, and was fined £100 in 1916 for trying to prevent people from joining the Army.

The SLP was heavily involved in the Clyde Workers' Committee and, although he did not succeed in starting such a movement in Leicester, Ramsay supported similar initiatives across the country.  He became treasurer of the Shop Stewards' and Workers' Committees organisation, within which he led efforts to organise the unemployed and was involved in organising ex-servicemen.  In 1919, police claimed that he had given a seditious speech, advocating using machine guns to start a revolution.  Ramsay denied the details, claiming that words had been added to his speech, but was jailed for five months.

Ramsay supported the October Revolution, and became the treasurer of the Hands Off Russia movement.  He was involved in the negotiations to form the Communist Party of Great Britain (CPGB), being one of the leading opponents of it attempting to affiliate to the Labour Party.  Although he lost the debate, he attended the 2nd Congress of the Communist International as a shop stewards' delegate, along with others such as John S. Clarke, Helen Crawfurd, Williie Gallacher, Wlliam McLaine, JT Murphy, Sylvia Pankhurst, Tom Quelch, Marjory Newbold and Jack Tanner.  In order to do so, he had to obtain a passport, under the cover story that he wished to emigrate to Argentina and, before doing so, visit relatives in Norway (actually a Bolshevik based there).  His request was taken to the Home Secretary, who consulted colleagues but surprisingly decided to grant it.  Following the Congress, he stayed in Russia for a while, working for the Comintern, and frequently travelled between there and the UK.

Once Ramsay returned to the UK, he served on the CPGB's Central Committee, and worked as an instructor for the party.  He was also involved in devising propaganda for the party.  In 1926, he was appointed as its Scottish Organiser, and he also served as the election agent for Harry Pollitt in Seaham at the 1929 general election.

MI5 kept Ramsay under constant surveillance, believing that he may have been spying for the Soviet Union.  Their internal files stated that he left the CPGB in 1932, and found work as a courier for the Soviet embassy.  However, Harry Pollitt eulogised him in his account of the thirtieth anniversary of the party, suggesting that his departure from the party was merely to try to deflect the attention of the secret services.

References

1883 births
1948 deaths
British Socialist Party members
Communist Party of Great Britain members
Politicians from Edinburgh
Social Democratic Federation members
Socialist Labour Party (UK, 1903) members
People convicted of sedition
British Comintern people